Atter is a term for poison or venom, found in Old Norse as eitr.

Atter may also refer to:

People
 Tom Atter
 Mahmoud Atter Abdel Fattah

Places
 Atter Shisha
 Atter (Osnabrück), district in the west of Osnabrück, Lower Saxony, Germany

Other
 Ätter, Norse clans, a social group based on common descent
 Gigantochloa atter, a species of bamboo

See also 
 Otter (disambiguation)